The Ujjain Mahaliamman Temple is a Hindu temple located at Thanjavur in the state of Tamil Nadu, India.

Location
The temple of goddess is one of the famous temples in Thanjavur district. The temple is located in East Gate area of Thanjavur. This temple is very near to Vellai Vinayakar Temple.

Structure
Sula, Balipeetam and lion are found facing the presiding deity. The entrance to the main shrine is flanked with Vinayaka at the right and Subramania with his consorts Valli and Deivanai at the left side. In the prakara, Yenathi Nayanar, Durga,  Ayyappan, Hanuman,  the neem tree, Nāga and Navagraha are found.

Presiding deity
In the garbhagriha, the presiding deity Ujjain Mahaliamman is found in sitting posture, facing east.

History
Once members belonging to a family came to Thanjavur for carrying out business, accompanied by a ten-year-old girl and her brother. They halted in a hut, very near to the place where the present temple structure was found. The family members went outside leaving the girl inside. On return they found their hut was found locked from inside. In spite of repeated calls the door was not opened. When they broke the entrance gate and gathered entry, to their shock they saw a girl in the form of a sculpture. Later they started to construct a temple and worship her.

Kumbhabhishekham
The Kumbhabhishekham of this temple was held during 1989 and 2008. The third kumbhabhishekham of the temple took place on 10th February 2023.

References

External links
 சிறுமி அம்மன் சிலையாக மாறிக் காட்சியளித்த திருத்தலம்!, தினமணி, 6 சூன் 2018
 தஞ்சை உஜ்ஜையினி மாகாளிஅம்மன் கோவில் குடமுழுக்கு விழாவையொட்டி 2 ஆயிரம் பெண்களுடன் புனிதநீர் ஊர்வலம், தினத்தந்தி, 7 பிப்ரவரி 2023
 தஞ்சை உஜ்ஜையினி மாகாளி அம்மன் கோயிலில் சிறப்பாக நடைபெற்ற யாகசாலை பூஜைகள், நியூஸ்18, 9 பிப்ரவரி 2023

Shakti temples
Mariamman temples
Hindu temples in Thanjavur district